Gabriele Maria "Gabriellino" D'Annunzio (10 April 1886 – 8 December 1945) was an Italian actor, screenwriter and film director. He was the son of the Italian writer Gabriele D'Annunzio. He adapted the 1921 film The Ship from a novel by his father. In 1924 he co-directed the epic Quo Vadis with Georg Jacoby, but the project was a commercial failure and he retired from filmmaking. He died on 8 December 1945 at 59 years old, due to a disease that afflicted him.

Selected filmography
 The Ship (1921)
 Quo Vadis (1924)

References

Bibliography 
 Brunetta, Gian Piero. The History of Italian Cinema: A Guide to Italian Film from Its Origins to the Twenty-first Century. Princeton University Press, 2009.

External links 
 

1886 births
1945 deaths
Italian male film actors
Italian film directors
20th-century Italian screenwriters
Italian male screenwriters
Writers from Rome
20th-century Italian male actors
20th-century Italian male writers